The 2001–02 season was the 116th season in the history of Luton Town Football Club. The club's 22nd-place finish in Division Two in 2000–01 meant they competed in Division Three for the first time in 33 years. After a summer of upheaval from manager Joe Kinnear, the club comfortably secured automatic promotion by finishing in second place in the league, 18 points ahead of their nearest rivals. Cup competitions proved to be far less of a success, with Luton exiting the FA Cup, League Cup and Football League Trophy at the first hurdle.

The 2001–02 season is also notable for Kinnear creating the nucleus of the successful Luton team of future years: centre-back Chris Coyne, midfielders Kevin Nicholls and Ahmet Brković, and striker Steve Howard would all go on to prove themselves as fully adept at playing at a higher level for the club.

This article covers the period from 1 July 2001 to 30 June 2002.

Background

Instability and inexperience had proved to be Luton's downfall in the previous season with two former players, Ricky Hill and Lil Fuccillo, winning just four out of 26 games as managers and ultimately contributing to the club's relegation from Division Two. An under-performing squad, expensive yet underwhelming signings and poor quality, untested players from abroad left the club languishing deep in the relegation zone. Ex-Wimbledon boss Joe Kinnear was appointed, initially, as director of football on 8 February 2001, but his first act in the job was to immediately demote Fuccillo to an assistant role and install himself as manager. Kinnear's arrival saw Luton win five of their next seven games, raising hopes of avoiding relegation. However, the team's good form soon collapsed as they failed to win again that season. The damage had been done long before Kinnear's appointment as Luton fell into the bottom tier of league football for the first time since 1968.

Kinnear began building his own squad over a month before the 2000–01 season had even finished, releasing players he deemed as surplus to requirements and notably signing striker Steve Howard for £50,000 from Northampton Town in March.

Review

Pre-season
Former Luton Town striker and fan-favourite Mick Harford was installed as first-team coach in early July, as Kinnear began to overhaul his backroom staff as well as playing squad. Former Luton youth player Aaron Skelton arrived from Colchester United on a free transfer to boost the defence, goalkeeper Carl Emberson was drafted in from Walsall, and prolific lower-league striker Carl Griffiths was signed from Leyton Orient for £65,000. Winger Adrian Forbes and midfielder Paul Hughes were signed from Norwich City and Southampton respectively, whilst the only player to leave was Finnish defender Petri Helin. What would prove later to be a shrewd signing was the capture of influential midfielder Kevin Nicholls for £25,000 from Wigan Athletic.

August and September
Luton began the season with a number of injuries to key players, including Matthew Spring, Aaron Skelton and Adrian Forbes. The team managed to secure a series of good results despite an ever-changing squad, with just one loss in their first six league games. New signing Carl Griffiths lived up to his goalscoring reputation, hitting the net three times as Luton hovered near the top of the table. Reading knocked Luton out of the League Cup with a 4–0 hammering at the Madejski Stadium.

Meanwhile, members of the playing staff continued to change – right-back Ian Hillier was signed on a three-month loan from Tottenham Hotspur in mid-August and centre-back Russell Perrett was drafted in on a free transfer from Cardiff City. Players from the previous regime, such as Norwegian Kent Karlsen, were released from their contracts as Kinnear looked to trim the squad.

A 2–1 victory over York City on 15 September was marred by an incident involving Steve Howard. With Luton awarded a penalty, the striker took it, but it was promptly saved. However, the referee had seen an infringement and Luton were ordered to re-take the penalty. Despite his team-mates protests, Howard grabbed the ball from captain and designated penalty-taker Skelton and placed it on the spot. Once again, he saw it saved. A seething Howard was immediately substituted for eventual match-winner Ian Hillier. Manager Joe Kinnear later branded Howard a "disgrace", and even considered placing him on the transfer list.

Australian centre-back Chris Coyne signed from Dundee for £50,000 on 17 September on a three-year contract and was immediately placed into the team that drew 1–1 with Lincoln City a day later – a team minus Steve Howard, whom Kinnear had dropped. French winger Jean-Louis Valois was signed on a one-year contract from Lille on 21 September and put in a stunning performance in a 5–1 demolition of Torquay United the next day, setting up two goals and scoring from 40 yards in a game that saw Griffiths score a hat-trick.

Striker Dean Crowe signed on a one-month loan on 28 September from Stoke City after news that leading scorer Carl Griffiths was ruled out through injury; later revealed to be a fractured leg that would keep him out for the rest of the season.

After a 2–1 loss away to Plymouth Argyle ended Luton's seven game unbeaten run, the team found themselves in third place in the table at the end of September.

October and November
Injuries persisted at Kenilworth Road: Paul Hughes was ruled out for three months; captain Aaron Skelton had suffered a broken foot; striker Andrew Fotiadis was still recovering from an ankle injury, and veteran defender Marvin Johnson required specialist treatment. Ahmet Brković, a Croatian midfielder who had most recently played for Leyton Orient, signed on a free transfer on 4 October.

By the end of October, Luton found themselves topping the table, despite suffering their first home defeat of the season to Rochdale. The Football League Trophy saw an inexperienced Luton side knocked out by non-League Dagenham & Redbridge in the second round.

Players continued to move in and out of the club, with forwards Stuart Douglas and Peter Thomson loaned to Oxford United and Rushden & Diamonds respectively, and both Ian Hillier and Dean Crowe making their own loan moves at Luton permanent; Hillier for £30,000, and Crowe for free. With the loan places in the squad now freed up, Kinnear moved to sign Crewe Alexandra midfielder Kevin Street on a one-month loan.

November saw the team grind to a halt – one win in four games led the club to fall to fifth in the league. Two heavy defeats to Mansfield Town and Macclesfield Town, and a home loss to Hull City, meant the Hatters needed a good spell of form over the winter to maintain their promotion ambitions. Southend United knocked Luton out of the FA Cup at the First Round on 17 November.

December and January
An outbreak of flu led to the cancellation of Luton's game at Kidderminster Harriers, which, combined with injuries, left Kinnear with fewer than eleven players to choose from.

Defender David Bayliss was signed from Rochdale on 7 December as Luton looked to patch up their injury-hit squad. Bayliss started in the game at Hartlepool United, where Luton returned to winning ways with a 2–1 victory. A swift return to their early season form left Luton safely in the automatic promotion places by mid-January, thanks to an eight-game unbeaten streak and a strong scoring run from Dean Crowe.

Striker Liam George and midfielder Dean Brennan were released from their contracts on 23 December. In addition, Stuart Douglas was sent on a two-month loan to Rushden & Diamonds after his spell at Oxford came to an end. Peter Thomson, after an unsuccessful loan at Rushden, was released by Luton on 31 January.

February, March and April
Further changes were afoot, with Kinnear signing defender Alan Neilson from Fulham. To balance this, Jude Stirling was sent on loan to neighbouring team Stevenage Borough, which was later converted into a permanent deal. Strikers Gary McSwegan and Steve Kabba were signed on one-month loans from Hearts and Crystal Palace respectively, to provide competition for places up front. Long-term injury victim Stuart Fraser was released on 21 March, bringing an end to a five-year spell at Luton.

Another stutter in the promotion bid came when Luton picked up just five points from a possible eighteen through late-January to mid-February. A 2–0 victory, the only win in this period, over leaders Plymouth Argyle saw the highest attendance at Kenilworth Road in over seven years, when Luton were in Division One, as 9,585 fans packed in. Fellow promotion hopefuls Rochdale ground out a 1–0 victory to close the gap between the clubs, and Scunthorpe United scored a last-minute winner at Kenilworth Road – this saw Luton balanced precariously between the automatic promotion places and the playoffs with around a quarter of the season left to play.

However, a run of twelve consecutive victories, with a 3–1 win away to Swansea City on 30 March clinching the club's first promotion in twenty years, ensured Luton went back to the Second Division with four games left to play, breaking several long-standing club records in the process. Steve Howard scored thirteen goals in those twelve games to finish the season as top scorer of the Third Division with twenty-four goals.

Luton finished a comfortable eighteen points ahead of third-placed Mansfield Town and just five points behind leaders Plymouth Argyle. The club claimed the highest goal difference and goals scored in the league, averaging just over two goals every game. Matthew Taylor, naturally a left-back, but pushed forward by Kinnear often, won the PFA Third Division player of the year award, scoring eleven goals in total. Taylor was also included in the PFA Division Three Team of the Season, the only Luton player to do so.

May and June
Joe Kinnear immediately set about keeping his squad for the next season, securing contract extensions for Kevin Nicholls, David Bayliss, Alan Neilson, Ahmet Brković and Paul Hughes. Highly rated midfielder Matthew Spring, who had progressed through the youth team and was coming close to the end of his contract, signed a new two-year deal. His fellow academy graduate Matthew Taylor refused a new contract and, as he was under 24 years old, Luton were entitled to a fee from any club that bought his services. That club proved to be Division One side Portsmouth, who offered £150,000. Kinnear reacted furiously, calling the offer "an insult" and exclaiming that "at least Dick Turpin had the decency to wear a mask." The two clubs eventually reached a deal for an initial £400,000, rising to £750,000 based on appearances.

Striker Tony Thorpe returned to the club on 12 June after a four-year absence, signing a two-year contract. Preston North End midfielder and Northern Irish international Steve Robinson joined Luton for a fee of £50,000 two weeks later.

Match results

Luton Town results given first.

Legend

Friendlies

Football League Third Division

All results, goals, attendances etc. taken from Soccerbase and verified with official Luton Town match reports.

FA Cup

Football League Cup

Football League Trophy

League table

Player statistics
Last match played on 20 April 2002. Players with a zero in every column only appeared as unused substitutes.

Managerial statistics
Only competitive games from the 2001–02 season are included.

Awards
Awarded on 21 April 2002.

Transfers

In

Out

Loans in

Loans out

See also
List of Luton Town F.C. seasons

Footnotes

A.  Behind closed-doors friendly.
B.  Luton received a bye into the Southern Section Second Round.
C.  Howard and Taylor shared the Players' Player of the Season award.
D.  The goal of the season was chosen as Jean-Louis Valois' strike against Torquay United on 22 September 2001.

References

2001–02
Luton Town